Arnau Puigmal Martínez (born 10 January 2001) is a Spanish footballer who plays for UD Almería as a central midfielder.

Club career

Early career
Born in Barcelona, Catalonia, Puigmal joined RCD Espanyol's youth setup in 2010, from Penya Blaugrana Sant Cugat del Vallès. In May 2017, after impressing with the Cadete A squad, he signed a contract with Manchester United.

Manchester United
Puigmal arrived at United in the 2017 summer, and played for the under-18s before signing his first professional contract on 12 January 2018. He was promoted to the under-23s in 2019, and played his first senior match with the side on 1 October of that year, as he started as a right back in a 1–0 away win over Lincoln City, for the season's EFL Trophy.

Puigmal scored his first senior goal on 9 September 2020, netting the second in a 6–0 away success over Salford City. The following 4 June, he was one of the eight players released by the club as his contract was due to expire.

Almería
On 9 July 2021, free agent Puigmal signed a five-year contract with Segunda División side UD Almería. He made his professional debut on 16 August, coming on as a late substitute for goalscorer Largie Ramazani in a 3–1 away win over FC Cartagena.

During a match against Mallorca in the 2022-23 season, Puigmal shoved opponent Lee Kang-in to the ground for dribbling the ball to the corner flag. Puigmal then grabbed Lee's head while on the ground and shoved him multiple times. Puigmal was given a yellow card for his aggressive behavior.

International career
Puigmal represented Spain at under-17, under-18 and under-19 levels.

Career statistics

Club

Honours
Almería
 Segunda División: 2021–22

References

External links

2001 births
Living people
Footballers from Barcelona
Spanish footballers
Association football midfielders
Segunda División players
UD Almería players
Manchester United F.C. players
Spain youth international footballers
Spanish expatriate footballers
Spanish expatriate sportspeople in England
Expatriate footballers in England